Gauguin the Savage is a 1980 American TV film. It is a biopic of the artist Paul Gauguin starring David Carradine.

Cast
David Carradine as Paul Gauguin
Lynn Redgrave as Mette Gad
Flora Robson as Sister Allandre
Michael Hordern as Durand-Huel
Ian Richardson as Degas
Bernard Fox as Captain Chablat
Barrie Houghton as Vincent van Gogh
Emrys James as Maurice Schuffenecker
Carmen Mathews as Madame Jeanette
Alan Caillou as Inspector Aumont
Christopher Cary as Doctor Feydeau
Fiona Fullerton as Rachel
Alex Hyde-White as Emil
Timothy Carlton as De Monfreid

References

External links

1980 television films
1980 films
American television films
Films directed by Fielder Cook